The Guildford Crescent Baths, originally known as the Corporation Baths, was a public swimming pool building in the centre of Cardiff, Wales. It was demolished in 1985.

Background
The swimming baths in Guildford Crescent, Cardiff, were originally opened by the Cardiff Baths Company Ltd in April 1862. They included a first class and a second class swimming pools, a Turkish bath, a Mikveh and a gymnasium. The building was designed by T. Waring and cost £3,700 to construct. With a capacity of one million gallons of water, the facilities were located next to the Bute Docks Feeder canal. The canal was culverted in 1949 and now flows under Churchill Way.

Cardiff Borough Council acquired the baths in 1873. Originally open-air, work began to add a roof to the baths in 1884 and took eight years to complete. The newly roofed and refurbished facilities were officially re-opened by in 1896 by Lady Windsor.

After the Empire Pool was opened in 1958, the Guildford Crescent Baths were given over exclusively for use by children.

The baths finally closed on 31 March 1984, despite a campaign to keep them open, which had gathered more than 10,000 signatures. The building was demolished in 1985 and, in the 2000s, an Ibis hotel was built on the site.

References

External links
 – Television news report shot in the baths, about the decision to close them

Demolished buildings and structures in Wales
Demolished sports venues in the United Kingdom
Sports venues demolished in 1985
Sports venues in Cardiff
Swimming venues in Wales